Youth is an upcoming South Korean television series based on the BTS Universe, starring Seo Ji-hoon, Noh Jong-hyun, Ahn Ji-ho, Seo Young-joo, Kim Yoon-woo, Jung Woo-jin, and Jeon Jin-seo.

Synopsis
"Youth will expand on the storyline fans have seen throughout BTS' music videos and Save Me webtoon. The story will begin with Seok-jin meeting the other six boys. He learns that everyone is dealing with their own struggles, and together, they learn to overcome their greatest difficulties."

Cast and characters

 Seo Ji-hoon
 Noh Jong-hyun
 Ahn Ji-ho
 Seo Young-joo
 Kim Yoon-woo
 Jung Woo-jin
 Jeon Jin-seo

Production

Development
On August 21, 2019, Big Hit Entertainment's co-CEO Bang Si-hyuk announced that a drama based on the debut days of BTS was in the early stages of production to be released in the second half of 2020 as part of the BTS Universe. The series is co-produced by Chorokbaem Media. Originally titled Blue Sky, the series' name was later changed to Youth.

Casting
On June 17, 2020, it was reported that the production companies were in the process of casting the main and supporting actors, and that the main cast would only consist of rookie actors. On October 19, it was announced that Seo Ji-hoon, Noh Jong-hyun, Ahn Ji-ho, Seo Young-joo, Kim Yoon-woo, Jung Woo-jin and Jeon Jin-seo would star in the series.

Filming
Filming was halted in late October 2020 following concerns raised by fans about the characters' names being the same as the group members' names. Originally scheduled to resume in early December, filming was eventually pushed back to January 2021. On April 7, 2021, it was announced that the main characters' names would be changed, and some scenes reshot.

Production
Chorokbaem Media announced the end of production in late November and began post-production to enhance the "quality" of the series.

Release
Chorokbaem Media also noted that the series will soon begin discussions with an unnamed "global OTT platform" for its distribution and broadcasting.

The series was originally slated to premiere in 2021, but it was delayed due to post-production improvements.

References

External links
 

Korean-language television shows
South Korean drama television series
Hybe Corporation
BTS Universe
Television series by Chorokbaem Media
Upcoming television series